"What Is This Thing Called Love?" is a song written by Jimmy Jam and Terry Lewis and recorded by American recording artist Alexander O'Neal. It is the second single from the singer's fourth solo album, All True Man (1991). The song's distinctive backing vocals were performed by Lisa Keith. Following the successful chart performances of the All True Man single  "All True Man", "What Is This Thing Called Love?" was released as the album's second single.

Release
Alexander O'Neal's 19th hit single and it reached #53 in the UK Singles Chart. In the United States, the single reached #21 on Billboards Hot R&B/Hip-Hop Singles & Tracks chart.

Track listing
 12" Maxi (45 73804) 
"What Is This Thing Called Love? (Dee Classic 12" Mix)" – 8:20
"What Is This Thing Called Love? (Dee Classic Radio Mix)" – 3:37
"What Is This Thing Called Love? (LP Edit)" – 3:58
"What Is This Thing Called Love? (Dee Red Zone Mix)" – 5:41
"What Is This Thing Called Love? (Dee Instrumental Mix)" – 5:58
"What Is This Thing Called Love? (Dee Reprise)" – 2:13

 7" Single (656731 7) / Cassette Single (656731 4)"What Is This Thing Called Love?" – 4:08
"Crying Overtime" – 4:55

 CD Single (656731 2)"What Is This Thing Called Love? (Album Version)" – 6:04
"The Lovers (Extended Version)" – 7:02
"If You Were Here Tonight" – 6:08

 CD Single (656731 9) 
"What Is This Thing Called Love? (Dee Classic 12" Mix)" – 8:20
"What Is This Thing Called Love? (Dee Classic Radio Mix)" – 3:37
"What Is This Thing Called Love? (Dee Red Zone Mix)" – 5:41
"What Is This Thing Called Love? (Dee Reprise)" – 2:13

 Cassette Single (35T 73810) 
"What Is This Thing Called Love? (Dee Classic Radio Mix)" – 3:37
"What Is This Thing Called Love? (Dee Instrumental Mix)" – 5:58

Personnel
Credits are adapted from the album's liner notes.

 Alexander O'Neal – lead vocals 
 Jimmy Jam – acoustic piano, keyboards, synthesizer, drum programming, rhythm & vocal arrangements
 Terry Lewis – rhythm & vocal arrangements, backing vocals
 Lee Blaskey – string arrangements
 Susie Allard – strings
 Mynra Rian – strings
 Joanna Shelton – strings
 Carolyn Daws – strings
 Mary Bahr – strings
 Lea Foli – strings
 Julia Persilz – strings
 Hyacinthe Tlucek – strings
 Maricia Peck – strings
 Jeanne Ekhold – strings
 Luara Sewell – strings
 Rudolph Lekhter – strings
 Lisa Keith – backing vocals

Charts

History
"What Is This Thing Called Love?'" had its bass-line sampled in the 2018 Kanye West and Lil Pump song, "I Love It".

References

External links
 

1991 singles
Alexander O'Neal songs
Songs written by Jimmy Jam and Terry Lewis
1991 songs
Song recordings produced by Jimmy Jam and Terry Lewis
Tabu Records singles